Kat Rattikarn (born 30 May 1973) is a Thai luk thung singer.

Life and career
She was born Putthachat Yoskewut in Lampang Province.

Her most popular songs include .

In 2017–18, she announced her retirement to live a Buddhist spiritual life.

Discography

Albums
   Together with Nueng Haruetai, Ple Chinorod ร่วมด้วย หนึ่ง หฤทัย, เปิ้ล ชิโณรส (2000)
 Yeb Jark Tak Fun เย็บจักรถักฝัน (2003)
 Chao Wan Mai Jai Tem Rak เช้าวันใหม่..ใจเต็มรัก (2005)
 Ni Yai Rak นิยายรัก (2006)
 Ni Yai Rak 2 นิยายรัก 2 (2007)
 Yah Keed Nuk อย่ากึ๊ดนัก (2009)
 Kon Hin Sin Jai ก้อนหินสิ้นใจ (2012)

External links

References

1973 births
Living people
Kat Rattikarn
Kat Rattikarn
Kat Rattikarn